Tarphius rufonodulosus is a species of ironclad beetle endemic to the island of Santa Maria in the archipelago of the Azores, Portugal.

References

Endemic arthropods of the Azores
Zopheridae
Beetles described in 1984
Beetles of Europe